Little Portugal may refer to:

 Little Portugal, London, England
 Little Portugal, Montreal, Canada
 Little Portugal, San Jose, California, U.S.
 Little Portugal, Toronto, Canada

See also

 Portugal
 Portuguese people
 Portuguese-American neighborhoods
 Fall River, Massachusetts, U.S., with the largest Portuguese American population
 The Ironbound, Newark, New Jersey, U.S., known for being a Portuguese neighborhood
 Petersham, New South Wales, Australia, known for its extensive Portuguese community
 Portuguese Settlement, Malacca, Malaysia